Big Body (stylized as big body) is the ninth studio album by P-Model and the second by the band's "defrosted" lineup.

Overview
Following in the footsteps of the self-titled P-Model, Big Body is another take on a science fiction themed album, putting greater emphasis on melodic variety.

Track listing

"Biiig Eye" contains a sample of "Loud, Loud, Loud" by Aphrodite's Child (lyrics by Costas Ferris).

All tracks arranged by Hirasawa, except 6 & 8 by Akiyama and 7 by Kotobuki. All track titles are stylized in all caps.

Personnel
P-Model
 Susumu Hirasawa - vocals, electric guitar, synthesizers, Amiga ("Say" program - lead vocals on "Binary Ghost"), programming, producer, computer graphics
  - synthesizers, vocoder, programming, lead vocals on "Journey Through Your Body" and "Burning Brain", backing vocals
 Hikaru Kotobuki - synthesizers, Compact Macintosh, programming, lead vocals on "Neoteny Box", backing vocals
 Yasuchika Fujii - electronic drums

technical
 Masanori Chinzei - engineer (mixing and recording)
 Motohiro Yamada (Eggs, Shep Studio), Harumi Ohta (Mix) - assistant engineers
 Keiko Ueda (Tokyu Fun) - mastering engineer

visuals
 Masahiro Kubo (VF) - art director, design
 Hideki Namai - photography
 Kazunori Yoshida - hair & make-up
 Akemi Tsujitani - styling
 Yoshino Takatsuki - costume design

operations
 Osamu Takeuchi (Polydor K.K.) - director
 I3 Promotion - artist management
 Yūichi Kenjo - co-producer
 Hiroki Yamaguchi - personal manager
 Shoko Mashio, Saya Ohta, Yuki Abiko - publicity coordination
 Tsutomu Fukushima - stage coordination
 Masami Fujii, Roppei Iwagami (Pre Octave) - publisher

thanks
 Tenney Tsuji, Yuji Matsuda, Susumu Kunisaki, AC Unit
 Akiyama special thanks: Tetsuji Fujita

Release history

References

External links
 big body at NO ROOM - The official site of Susumu Hirasawa (P-MODEL)
 
 big body at Universal Music Japan's official site
 GOLDEN☆BEST (reissue) at Universal Music Japan's official site
 big body at Tower Records Online

P-Model albums
Japanese-language albums
1993 albums
Polydor Records albums